"Bite Me" is a song by Canadian singer Avril Lavigne. It was released on November 10, 2021, through Elektra Records and as Lavigne's debut on Travis Barker's label DTA Records. It is the lead single from Lavigne's seventh studio album, Love Sux (2022). The song was noted by critics as a return to Lavigne's pop-punk roots. The song peaked at number 63 on the Canadian Hot 100 and number 61 on the UK Singles Chart.

Background and release 
Canadian pop punk artist Avril Lavigne released her sixth studio album, Head Above Water, on February 15, 2019, through BMG. The album was inspired by the two years during which Lavigne suffered from Lyme disease, which left her mostly bedridden and unable to perform. That September, Lavigne embarked on a North American tour in support of Head Above Water, her first such tour in five years. A European tour, originally set to begin in early 2020, had to be rescheduled for 2022 due to the COVID-19 pandemic.

While quarantined at home during the pandemic, Lavigne told American Songwriter that she had begun working on new music, which she hoped to release sometime in 2021. That December, Lavigne posted a photo on Instagram of her in a recording studio with Mod Sun and Machine Gun Kelly, leading to speculation that the trio was working on music together. "Flames", a Mod Sun song featuring Lavigne, was released on January 8, 2021. The following month, Lavigne confirmed on Instagram that she had finished working on her new album, and that she would release new music that summer. Producer John Feldmann, known for his work with bands such as Blink-182, All Time Low, and Goldfinger, meanwhile, confirmed to Wall of Sound that he had been working with Lavigne and that her new album would bring "back her pop punk roots".

Writing and composition
"Bite Me" is a pop punk song that has drawn comparisons to Lavigne's earlier studio albums Let Go (2002) and The Best Damn Thing (2007), as well as to the band Paramore. The song is written in the key of E-flat major, with a tempo of 170 beats per minute. Lyrically, Lavigne describes "Bite Me" as "an anthem about knowing your worth, what you deserve, and not giving someone a second chance who doesn't deserve you". Lavigne also described the track as a "super sassy" response to a romantic partner who realizes they made a mistake, only to be rejected when they attempt to reconcile.

The song was noted by several publications to mark Lavigne's return to the pop punk genre; with NME referring to it as a "pop-punk takedown of an ex", and Billboard describing it as a "guitar- and drum-heavy track" which "features Lavigne raging at her former lover for failing to treat her properly, promising that they'll always regret being kicked out of her life."

Release and promotion 

"Bite Me" was announced on November 5, 2021, when Lavigne posted the pre-save link together with the single's cover on Instagram and Twitter. On November 6, Lavigne posted a rehearsal video of her and Travis Barker with an audio snippet of the song on her social media.

In the United States, "Bite Me" was sent to alternative radio on November 16, 2021.

Critical reception
"Bite Me" received critical acclaim upon its release, with George Griffiths of Official Charts Company describing it as a "confident return to form for pop punk's reigning motherf**king princess" remarking that "it's a lovely surprise to hear just how fresh Avril sounds. Her voice is crisp and clear on the song's chorus; like she hasn't aged a day since she first dropped 'Complicated'." Writing for The A.V. Club, Tatiana Tenreyro opined that the song is "the closest to the Lavigne her early fans fell in love with at the beginning of her career. Not only is it a big return to pop punk, but it also sounds delightfully nostalgic." Reviewing for Gay Times, Conor Clark compared "Bite Me" to Lavigne's third studio album The Best Damn Thing (2007), and remarked that "Avril's fierce new song is a reminder of why she is and always will be the Queen of Pop Punk."

Year-end lists

Accolades

Commercial performance
Worldwide "Bite Me" debuted at number 133 on the Billboard Global 200 chart, it was Lavigne's first song to enter the chart.

In Canada, "Bite Me" debuted at number 63 on the Canadian Hot 100 chart, it was certified Gold in Canada with 40,000 units sold. "Bite Me" was Lavigne's first lead single to not enter the US Billboard Hot 100, but it peaked at number 20 on the Billboard Bubbling Under Hot 100 chart. and peaked at number 13 on the US Hot Rock & Alternative Songs chart. In the United Kingdom, "Bite Me" debuted at number 61 on the UK Singles Chart. "Bite Me" was certified Gold in Brazil with 20,000 units sold.

Music videos
The Hannah Lux Davis-directed music video was released on November 12, 2021. The music video debuted at number five on the Myx International Top 20 music videos chart.

The video for the acoustic version, directed by Mod Sun and Charlie Zwick, was released on December 17, 2021 and it featured John Feldmann and his wife Amy as doctor and nurse respectively. In it, Lavigne arrives at the dentist office and enters the room, while the doctor takes a break, to pull out all the patient's teeth which are then used to make a necklace.

Live performances
Lavigne performed "Bite Me" for the first time on The Late Late Show with James Corden on November 10, 2021, with drummer Travis Barker of Blink-182. Lavigne also did an interview with Corden about her new single "Bite Me", her upcoming seventh studio album, and her upcoming 2022 concert tour. On November 23, 2021, she performed the single on The Tonight Show Starring Jimmy Fallon. On November 30, 2021, Lavigne performed the single on The Ellen DeGeneres Show with drummer Travis Barker, it was her first appearance on the show since 2007. On December 31, 2021 Lavigne performed the single on Dick Clark's New Year's Rockin' Eve party as the last performance of that year. On January 16, 2022 Lavigne performed Bite Me during her surprise set at IHeart Alter Ego festival, along with her smash hits Girlfriend, My Happy Ending and Sk8er Boi. Lavigne also performed the single on Japanese TV show Music Station on February 11, 2022.

Credits and personnel
Credits and personnel are adapted from the Love Sux album liner notes.
 Avril Lavigne – vocals
 John Feldmann – guitar, bass, production
 Derek "Mod Sun" Smith – production
 Travis Barker – drums, production
 Dylan McLean – additional guitar and bass, additional production and engineering
 Scot Stewart – additional guitar and bass, additional production and engineering
 Michael Bono – additional guitar and bass, additional production and engineering
 Josh Thornberry – additional production and engineering
 Cameron Mizell – additional production and engineering
 Hero DeLano – additional production and engineering
 Kevin Thrash – additional engineering
 Chris Gehringer – mastering
 Adam Hawkins – mixing

Charts

Weekly charts

Year-end charts

Certifications

Release history

References

2021 singles
2021 songs
Avril Lavigne songs
DTA Records singles
Elektra Records singles
Music videos directed by Hannah Lux Davis
Song recordings produced by John Feldmann
Song recordings produced by Travis Barker
Songs written by Avril Lavigne
Songs written by John Feldmann
Songs written by Marshmello
Songs written by Mod Sun
Songs written by Omer Fedi